Sălcioara may refer to several places in Romania:

 Sălcioara, Dâmbovița, a commune in Dâmboviţa County
 Sălcioara, Ialomița, a commune in Ialomiţa County
 Sălcioara, a village in Ghergheasa Commune, Buzău County
 Sălcioara, a village in Curcani Commune, Călăraşi County
 Sălcioara, a village in Mătăsaru Commune, Dâmboviţa County
 Sălcioara, a village in Podenii Noi Commune, Prahova County
 Sălcioara, a village in Jurilovca Commune, Tulcea County
 Sălcioara, a village in Banca, Vaslui Commune, Vaslui County

See also 
Salcia (disambiguation)
Sălcuța (disambiguation)